"De Mis Pasos" is the first single on the debut album Aquí (Here) by Julieta Venegas.

Song 
"De Mis Pasos" was written by Julieta Venegas and deals with a woman who sees that following her steps can lead to learning from her own errors. In 2008, a new version for her album was played on MTV Unplugged, including a duet with Juan Son. It was number 90 of the best songs of the 90's in Spanish on Vh1

Video 
In the video Julieta is seen acting rebelliously and playing her accordion and walking from side to side. The video features scenes in color as well as in black and white.

List of songs 
 CD Promo
 "De Mis Pasos"
 "We Aren't Going to Leave" (Bon and the Enemies of Silence)
 CD Promo
 "De Mis Pasos"
 Interview

Versions 
 De mis pasos (Original Version)
 De mis pasos (Version MTV Unplugged with Juan Are)

References

External links 
  Video Official
  Version MTV Unplugged

Julieta Venegas songs
Spanish-language songs
1997 singles
Songs written by Julieta Venegas
1997 songs